Professor Martin Lowson (5 January 1938 – 14 June 2013) was an aeronautical engineer.  He held a number of senior academic appointments in UK and US universities, was a co-patentee of the BERP helicopter rotor system, and also made a significant contribution to the development of personal rapid transport systems.

Early life

Martin Vincent Lowson  was born in Totteridge, Hertfordshire, on 5 January 1938.

Education

He attended The King's School in Worcester, after which he became an apprentice with Vickers-Armstrong.  Lowson gained a PhD in 1963, after which he spent a year in the Institute of Sound & Vibration Research, where he worked on aero-acoustics.

Personal life

Lowson married Ann Pennicutt in 1961.  They had two children, Sarah and Jonathan.  Lowson's interests included squash and bluegrass music.

Death

Lowson died of a stroke on 14 June 2013, at the age of 75.

Honours and awards

 Royal Aeronautical Society Award for contributions to world’s first man powered flight 1961
 Fellow of the Acoustical Society of America 1969
 Fellow of the Royal Academy of Engineering 1991
 Busk Prize of Royal Aeronautical Society for best paper in Aerodynamics 1992.
 Queens Award for Technology received by Westland Team for BERP blade 1994
 Fellow of the American Institute of Aeronautics and Astronautics 1995
 British Wind Energy Association Award for Research 1997
 Altran Prize for Innovations to improve urban quality of life 2001
 Fellow, Chartered Institute of Transport 2003
 Viva Award for Transport Innovation from Worshipful Company of Carmen 2010
Sources:

References

English aerospace engineers
Fellows of the Royal Academy of Engineering
Fellows of the American Institute of Aeronautics and Astronautics
Academics of Loughborough University
Academics of the University of Bristol
Alumni of the University of Southampton
People from Totteridge
People educated at King's School, Worcester
1938 births
2013 deaths
Fellows of the Acoustical Society of America